Cymdeithas Lyfrau Ceredigion (CLC) was a Welsh publisher, established in 1954, specialising in books of interest to Ceredigion, and Welsh language children's books, including adaptations and original works. Cymdeithas Lyfrau Ceredigion bought the Welsh Teldisc Ltd c. 1974.

Some of the publisher's most popular books included those based on Sali Mali and her friends, a children's character originally created by author Mary Vaughan Jones and illustrated by Rowena Wyn Jones.

Cymdeithas Lyfrau Ceredigion came to an end in 2009, when it was bought out by another publisher, Gwasg Gomer.

Awards and honours

Publishing Industry Awards, Wales
 2005 – Children's Bestseller, Jac y Jwc ar y Fferm, Dylan Williams and Gordon Jones
 2007 – Best Christmas Book Cover Design, Hogan Mam, Babi Jam, Emily Huws
 2007 – Design and Production, Y Golygiadur, Rhiannon Ifans

References

External links 
  Documents available on the Archives Network Wales

Publishing companies established in 1954
Publishing companies disestablished in 2009
Publishing companies of Wales
Companies based in Ceredigion
1954 establishments in Wales
2009 disestablishments in Wales